Oreste Bernardoni (28 February 1911 – 10 August 1965) was a French racing cyclist. He rode in the 1935 Tour de France.

References

1911 births
1965 deaths
French male cyclists
Place of birth missing